Learmonth Airport  is a civil airport, co-located on the site of RAAF Base Learmonth, a Royal Australian Air Force (RAAF) base. The airport is located near the town of Exmouth on the north-west coast of Western Australia, in Australia.

The terminal opened on 3 December 1999.

On 7 October 2008, Qantas Flight 72 made an emergency landing at RAAF Learmonth. On 1 June 2012, an AirAsia X flight to Perth made an emergency landing at Learmonth Airport for refuelling. Learmonth is designated an emergency alternative airport in the case of fog or bad weather affecting Perth Airport.

Airlines and destinations

Statistics
Learmonth Airport was ranked 49th in Australia for the number of revenue passengers served in financial year 2012–2013.

See also
 List of airports in Western Australia
 Aviation transport in Australia

References

External links
Learmonth Airport at exmouth.wa.gov.au
 Airservices Aerodromes & Procedure Charts

Airports in Western Australia
Shire of Exmouth
1940s establishments in Australia